Nainankulam is a village in the Pattukkottai taluk of Thanjavur district, Tamil Nadu, India.

Demographics 

As per the 2001 census, Nainankulam had a total population of 647 with 339 males and 308 females. The sex ratio was 909. The literacy rate was 76.41.

References 

 

Villages in Thanjavur district